SS Karanja was a paddle steamer built in 1864 by Henderson, Coulborn and Company. The ship was completed in 1865, in the port of Renfrew. The ship weighed 228 tons and was 164 ft long. The Karanja had a beam of 23 ft 2 in and a draft of 7 ft 9 in. The ship was owned by Fulcher & Co., home-ported in Bombay, and used for river travel.

Footnotes

References

Steamships
1865 ships